Jean Monribot (born 11 October 1987) is a French rugby union player. His position is flanker and he currently plays for Aviron Bayonnais in the Top 14.

References

1987 births
Living people
French rugby union players
Rugby union flankers
Sportspeople from Dordogne
Aviron Bayonnais players
RC Toulonnais players
SU Agen Lot-et-Garonne players